Brahim Ben Daoud (born 7 May 1994) is a French professional footballer who plays as a forward for Istres, on loan from AC Arles-Avignon.

Club career
Ben Daoud made his full debut in a 1–1 Ligue 2 draw against Châteauroux in September 2013. 
He was sent on loan to Istres in January 2015.

References

External links
 

1994 births
Living people
French footballers
Association football forwards
French sportspeople of Algerian descent
Championnat National players
AC Arlésien players
FC Istres players